Camp Eagle may refer to:

Camp Eagle, a former U.S. military base in Bosnia and Herzegovina
Camp Eagle (Vietnam), a former U.S. military base in Vietnam
Camp Eagle Island, a summer camp in New York
Camp Eagle, a Boy Scout camp in Nebraska